The Bush Temple Conservatory of Music and Dramatic Art was an American conservatory of music based in Chicago with branches in Dallas and Memphis.

History 
The Conservatory was founded in 1901 by William Lincoln Bush (1861–1941), of the Chicago-based piano manufacturer and retailer, Bush & Gerts Piano Company, a company that he co-founded as W. H. Bush and Company in 1885 with (i) his father, William H. Bush, and (ii) a noted, German-born piano-maker, John Gerts (1845–1913).

 Bush Temple of Music, Chicago
 Northwest corner of North Clark Street and Chicago Avenue

 The building was a 6-story, early French Renaissance design by British-American Chicago architect John Edmund Oldaker Pridmore (1864–1940) featuring a buff brick and terra cotta exterior.  The Building originally had a clock tower and included a showroom for the Bush and Gerts Piano Company, the Bush Temple Conservatory of Music, the Bush Temple Theatre, a museum, and offices.  The building was designated a Chicago landmark in 2001.

 Facing a decline in interest in music education, The Bush Temple Conservatory moved to smaller quarters at 839 N. Dearborn St. in 1918. Constructed in 1878, this building was previously home to Grant's Seminary for Young Ladies (Grant Collegiate Institute) and Arlington Hotel.

 Bush Temple of Music, Memphis, gave its inaugural concert on January 28, 1905.

 Bush Temple of Music, Dallas was located at 307 Elm Street.  It was opened in 1903 and magaged by William Hayes Wray (1869–1943), who served as President of Bush and Gerts of Texas for twenty-five years.  The building, formerly known as the "March Building," was a four-story structure — formerly the Fakes Furniture Store — that was purchased in 1902 by Mars Nearing Baker (1854–1941) from Col. Stephen Ellis Moss (1853–1942).  Its auditorium, occupying the second and third floors, had a seating capacity of 1,500.  The remodeling was designed by Sanguinet & Staats.

Bush was treasurer of the Conservatory and also president of the Bush & Gerts Piano Company of Texas and the Bush Temple of Music in Dallas.  Bush & Gerts had branches in Boston, Dallas, Austin, and Memphis.

The conservatory flourished since its founding and was the first music conservatory in Chicago to provide  dormitories for out-of-state students.  In 1924, The Bush Conservatory was one of six institutions that founded the National Association of Schools of Music and Kenneth McPherson Bradley, president of the Bush Conservatory, served as its founding president from 1924 to 1928.

The conservatory's name ceased to exist in 1932 because —  months after the Wall Street Crash of 1929 and under financial duress of the ensuing Great Depression — it merged with the Chicago Conservatory College.

Presidents 
Chicago Temple Conservatory
 Kenneth McPherson Bradley (1872–1954) stepped down as president of the Bush Conservatory in October 1925 to become director of the Juilliard Foundation in New York. He was the nephew of the former governor of Kentucky, William O'Connell Bradley.
 Edgar Andrew Nelson (1882–1957), a choral director and oratory coach, and vice president at the Bush Conservatory, was appointed President in October 1925, replacing Bradley.  Nelson was of Swedish descent.  He had studied piano with Emil Larson and, later, Harald von Mickwitz.  He also studied organ with Clarence Dickinson.  In 1908, Nelson earned a Bachelor of Music from the Bush Conservatory and subsequently was appointed assistant managing director of the conservatory.  Nelson went on to serve as president of the Chicago Conservatory, after the Bush Conservatory merged with it in 1932.

Noted faculty and alumni 
Faculty, Bush Conservatory, Chicago
 1921–1932 — Jan Chiapusso, piano
 Grace Potter Carroll (1883–1978)
 Charles W. Clark, baritone
 Fannie Bloomfield Zeisler, head of the piano department
 Frederic Lamond, guest artist who held several master classes
 Harriet Lundgren (1907-1996)
 Edgar Nelson
 Moissaye Boguslawski, piano
 Harald von Mickwitz
 Richard Rudolph Czerwonky (1886–1949), violinist
 Edgar Albert Brazelton (1875–1953), a pianist and theory teacher, eventually became Dean of the Chicago Conservatory of Music, after the merger
 Sergei Tarnowsky
 Herbert Miller
 John J. Blackmore
 Mae Graves Atkins, soprano
 Agnes Pringle, violinist who had studied with Leopold Auer
 Jeanette Lamden, vocalist
 Ebba Sundstrom Nylander (1896-1963), violinist and conductor

Faculty, Bush Conservatory, Memphis
 Frieda Siemens (pseudonym for Simonson; 1889–1969), pianist & director of the piano department.  On July 27, 1905, Frieda married James Francis Bliss (1878–1928) in Manhattan, New York City.  He was a dental surgeon from Springfield, Massachusetts.  
 Marie Greenwood-Guiberson (née Mary Susan Greenwood; 1864–1954), head of the vocal department.  She was married to William P. Guiberson, and later to Edmond Smither Worden (1877–1949)

Alumni, Bush Conservatory, Chicago
 Jane Jarvis
 Baylus Benjamin McKinney
 Harold Newton
 Gladys Swarthout
 Larry Shay
 Harold Triggs
 Pearl White (organist)
 Elsie Vieweger, vocalist

References

History of Chicago
Educational institutions established in 1901
Defunct private universities and colleges in Illinois
Universities and colleges in Chicago
1901 establishments in Illinois